Mega is a unit prefix in metric systems of units denoting a factor of one million (106 or ). It has the unit symbol M. It was confirmed for use in the International System of Units (SI) in 1960.

Common examples of usage
 Megapixel: 1 million pixels in a digital camera
 One megatonne of TNT equivalent amounts to approx. 4 petajoules and is the approximate energy released on igniting one million tonnes of TNT. The unit is often used in measuring the explosive power of nuclear weapons. 
 Megahertz: frequency of electromagnetic radiation for radio and television broadcasting, GSM, etc. 1 MHz = 1,000,000 Hz.
 Megabyte: unit of information equal to one million bytes (SI standard).
 Megawatt: equal to one million watts of power.  It is commonly used to measure the output of power plants, as well as the power consumption of electric locomotives, data centers, and other entities that heavily consume electricity.
 Megadeath: (or megacorpse) is one million human deaths, usually used in reference to projected number of deaths from a nuclear explosion. The term was used by scientists and thinkers who strategized likely outcomes of all-out nuclear warfare.

Exponentiation
When units occur in exponentiation, such as in square and cubic forms, any multiples-prefix is considered part of the unit, and thus included in the exponentiation.

Computing
In some fields of computing, mega may sometimes denote 1,048,576 (220) of information units, for example, a megabyte, a megaword, but denotes  (106) units of other quantities, for example, transfer rates:  = . The prefix mebi- has been suggested as a prefix for 220 to avoid ambiguity.

See also
 Binary prefix
 Mebibyte
 Order of magnitude
 RKM code

References

External links

BIPM website

SI prefixes

he:תחיליות במערכת היחידות הבינלאומית#מגה